Warrongo or Warrungu may refer to:

Warrongo people of Queensland, Australia
Warrongo language spoken by them

Language and nationality disambiguation pages